Pterocella is a genus of bryozoans belonging to the family Catenicellidae. The genus was first described by Georg Marius Reinald Levinsen in 1909.

The species of this genus are found in Australia (off the coasts of Western Australia, South Australia and New South Wales), and New Zealand.

Species:

Pterocella elongata 
Pterocella flexuosa 
Pterocella gemella 
Pterocella halli 
Pterocella scutella 
Pterocella vesiculosa

References

External links
Pterocella images & occurrence data from GBIF

Bryozoan genera
Crustaceans described in 1909